Dysomma muciparus is an eel in the family Synaphobranchidae (cutthroat eels). It was described by Alfred William Alcock in 1891. It is a tropical, marine eel which is known from the Indo-Pacific. It is known to dwell at a depth range of 439–505 metres.

References

Synaphobranchidae
Fish described in 1891